Saddle Island is an island located in the Great Southern region of Western Australia.

Situated in the Southern Ocean, the island is adjacent to Nornalup Inlet and the Walpole-Nornalup National Park.

Saddle Island is the largest of the nearby islands that are all gazetted as part of Class A Reserve 31362. Other islands that make up part of the reserve are Goose Island (directly south of Saddle Island) and the Casurina Islands.

The flesh-footed shearwater and the little shearwater are both known to inhabit the island and use it as a breeding ground.

References

Islands of the Great Southern (Western Australia)